The 2001 Japanese Formula 3 Championship was the 23rd edition of the Japanese Formula 3 Championship. It began on 25 March at Suzuka and ended on 21 October at Motegi. French driver Benoît Tréluyer took the championship title by winning 15 of 19 races.

Teams and drivers
 All teams were Japanese-registered. All cars were powered by Bridgestone  tires.

Race calendar and results

Standings
Points are awarded as follows:

References

External links
 Official Site 

Formula Three
Japanese Formula 3 Championship seasons
Japan